Keith Ismael (born July 25, 1998) is an American football center for the San Francisco 49ers of the National Football League (NFL). He played college football at San Diego State and was drafted by the Washington Football Team in the fifth round of the 2020 NFL Draft.

College career
A 2-star recruit, Ismael committed to San Diego State over offers from Air Force, Army, Colorado State, Eastern Washington, Hawaii, Montana, San Jose State, UC Davis, and Utah State.
Ismael was a three-year starter at San Diego State. He was named second-team All-Mountain West Conference as a freshman and to the first-team as a sophomore and as a junior. Following the 2019 season, he announced he would be forgoing his senior season by entering the 2020 NFL Draft.

Professional career

Washington Football Team / Commanders
Ismael was selected by the Washington Football Team in the fifth round (156th overall) of the 2020 NFL Draft. He signed his four-year rookie contract on July 22, 2020. Ismael was released on August 31, 2021, and re-signed to the practice squad the following day. He was promoted to the active roster on November 4. In the Week 12 win against the Seattle Seahawks, Ismael took over at center after starter Wes Schweitzer left the game after suffering an ankle injury. The following week, Ismael made his first career start against the Las Vegas Raiders which made him the fourth starting center for the team in the 2021 season.

On March 16, 2022, the team placed an exclusive-rights free agent tender on Ismael, which he signed on April 20. He was placed on injured reserve as part of finalizing the 53-man roster, but released with an injury settlement on September 5, 2022.

San Francisco 49ers
On September 13, 2022, Ismael signed with the practice squad of the San Francisco 49ers. He signed a reserve/future contract on January 31, 2023.

References

External links

San Diego State bio

1998 births
Living people
Players of American football from Oakland, California
American football centers
San Diego State Aztecs football players
Washington Football Team players
San Francisco 49ers players